Rolf Birkhölzer (born 29 September 1949) is a German former professional footballer who played as a goalkeeper.

He started playing football at the age of nineteen for 1. FC Köln. He also played for KSV Hessen Kassel, VfB Gießen and TuSpo Ziegenhain in a playing career that lasted thirteen years and finished in 1981. He later became the coach of FSV Frankfurt, Schrecksbach, Bad Homburg and TuSpo Ziegenhain.

Birkhölzer played seven internationals for Germany's youth side.

References

1949 births
Living people
German footballers
Association football goalkeepers
Bundesliga players
1. FC Köln players
1. FC Köln II players
KSV Hessen Kassel players
Footballers from Frankfurt